Ágnes Bíró (December 28, 1917 – 2008) was a Hungarian freestyle swimmer who competed in the 1936 Summer Olympics. She was born in Budapest.

In 1936, she was a member of the Hungarian relay team which finished fourth in the 4 x 100 metre freestyle relay event. In the 400 metre freestyle competition she was eliminated in the first round.

External links

1917 births
2008 deaths
Hungarian female swimmers
Olympic swimmers of Hungary
Swimmers at the 1936 Summer Olympics
Hungarian female freestyle swimmers
Swimmers from Budapest
20th-century Hungarian women